Pavel Šimáček (born 28 April 1979) is a Czech chess grandmaster. He won the Czech Chess Championship in 2009.

Chess career
Born in 1979, Šimáček earned his international master title in 2002 and his grandmaster title in 2018. He won the Czech Chess Championship in 2009. He is the No. 16 ranked Czech player as of May 2018.

References

External links

1979 births
Living people
Chess grandmasters
Czech chess players